"Guess I'll Hang My Tears Out to Dry" is a 1944 torch song and jazz standard, with music by Jule Styne and lyrics by Sammy Cahn. It was introduced on stage by film star Jane Withers in the show Glad To See You, which closed in Boston and never opened on Broadway. The duo Styne and Cahn had previously written songs for several of Withers' films.

Notable recordings
Harry James (vocalist Kitty Kallen) - Columbia 36778 (1945)
Frank Sinatra with Axel Stordahl - Columbia 38474 (1946)
Milli Vernon - Introducing Milli Vernon (1956)
Frank Sinatra - Frank Sinatra Sings for Only the Lonely (1958)
Cannonball Adderley - Cannonball Takes Charge (1959)
Dexter Gordon - Go (1962)
Irene Kral - Better Than Anything (1963)
Sarah Vaughan - Sarah Sings Soulfully (1963)
Ray Charles - Sweet & Sour Tears (1964)
Jack Jones - Where Love Has Gone (1964)
Carmen McRae - Bittersweet (1964)
Linda Ronstadt - What's New (1983)
Mel Tormé - Sing Sing Sing (1992)
Diane Schuur - In Tribute (1992)
Frank Sinatra, Carly Simon - Duets (1993)
John Pizzarelli John Pizzarelli Trio "After Hours" (1996) 
Rosemary Clooney with the Count Basie Orchestra - At Long Last (1998)
Keith Jarrett Trio - My Foolish Heart (2001)
Patti LuPone - The Lady With the Torch (2006)
Diana Krall - Quiet Nights (2009)
Royce Campbell - All Ballads And A Bossa (2012)
Steve Tyrell - The Songs of Sammy Cahn (2013)
Seth MacFarlane - No One Ever Tells You (2015)

References

Songs with lyrics by Sammy Cahn
Songs with music by Jule Styne
Frank Sinatra songs
Torch songs
1944 songs